Irving Malin (March 18, 1934 – December 3, 2014) was an American literary critic. Malin attended Thomas Jefferson High School and Jamaica High School and graduated magna cum laude from Queens College in 1955 and received his PhD from Stanford University in 1958. He married Ruth Lief in 1955 and they remained married until his death. He taught at the City College of New York from 1960 until his retirement in 1996. Malin did his dissertation on the fiction of William Faulkner and made his initial academic mark as a critic of American Jewish Literature, editing an early collection on the fiction of Saul Bellow as well as a critical book and a general anthology on Jewish literature in the US.  He subsequently became interested in writers who practiced innovative techniques such as James Purdy and John Hawkes  as well as writers  who broke down the boundaries between fiction and nonfiction such as William Styron and Truman Capote. One of the pioneering academics to take an interest in metafiction and experimental writing, Malin was an early contributor to the Review of Contemporary Fiction, writing over five hundred book reviews for this and other publications (like the Hollins Critic).  In the latter portion of his career, Malin edited several anthologies of essays  on Henry James, Thomas Pynchon, William Goyen, George Garrett, Don DeLillo, Vladimir Nabokov, Leslie Fiedler, and William Gass. He was a fellow at Yaddo and the Huntington Library and served on many boards and award panels. Malin died December 3, 2014.

Books
 William Faulkner: An Interpretation. Stanford University Press, 1957
 New American Gothic. Southern Illinois University Press, 1962
 Jews and Americans. Southern Illinois University Press, 1965
 Psychoanalysis and American Fiction. Dutton, 1965
 Saul Bellow and the Critics. New York University Press, 1967
 Saul Bellow's Fiction. Southern Illinois University Press, 1969
 Nathanael West's Novels. Southern Illinois University Press, 1972

References

1934 births
American humanities academics
American literary critics
City College of New York faculty
Jewish American writers
2014 deaths
Queens College, City University of New York alumni
Stanford University alumni
Jamaica High School (New York City) alumni
Thomas Jefferson High School (Brooklyn) alumni
21st-century American Jews